Jawahar Navodaya Vidyalaya, Lahaul and Spiti or locally known as JNV Lari is a boarding, co-educational school in Lahaul and Spiti district of Himachal Pradesh state in India. Navodaya Vidyalayas are funded by the Indian Ministry of Human Resources Development and administered  by Navodaya Vidyalaya Smiti, an autonomous body under the ministry.

History 
The school was established in 2000, and is a part of Jawahar Navodaya Vidyalaya schools. The school was operating from temporary site in Tehsil Bhawan at Kaza. It was shifted in 2017 to the permanent campus at village Lari near Tabo. This school is administered and monitored by Chandigarh regional office of Navodaya Vidyalaya Smiti.

Admission 
Admission to JNV Lahaul and Spiti at class VI level is made through selection test conducted by Navodaya Vidyalaya Smiti. The information about test is disseminated and advertised in the district by the office of Lahaul and Spiti district magistrate (Collector), who is also chairperson of Vidyalya Management Committee.

Affiliations 
JNV Lahaul and Spiti is affiliated to Central Board of Secondary Education with affiliation number 640011.

See also 
 List of JNV schools
 Jawahar Navodaya Vidyalaya, Theog
 Jawahar Navodaya Vidyalaya, Kinnaur

References

External links 

 Official Website of JNV Lahaul and Spiti

High schools and secondary schools in Himachal Pradesh
Lahaul and Spiti
Educational institutions established in 2000
2000 establishments in Himachal Pradesh
Lahaul and Spiti district